Sakthikulangara is a zone and neighbourhood situated at the coastal area of the city of Kollam in Kerala India. It is one among the 6 zonal headquarters of Kollam Municipal Corporation.

Location
Sakthikulangara is situated where Ashtamudi Lake confluence with the Arabian Sea.  It is 7 km north from the core Kollam City and 31 km away from Paravur town. Heading from North Neendakara bridge opens the entrance to Sakthikulangara village.

Celebrities
Moreover, it is the birthplace of B. Wellington, E. Balanandan, R. S. Unni and Henry Austin (Former Ambassador of India in Portugal).

P.J.Rajendran politician, leader of cpim leading party of Kerala and chairman for health standing committee  Kollam Municipal Corporation(KMC) councillor AT alattukavu divition.

S.meenakumari, politician leader of revolutionary socialist party (rsp) ex health chairman & councillor at sakthikulangara division... 
Cine field
Prateeksha Peter (Producer)
Joy Thomas (Producer)
Sangeeth Kollam (Editor & Associate director)
Bijou Antony  (Producer).
John Mary (Journalist)
Navis Xaviour (Producer)
Dr.Jolly Jose (JDNE, Kerala)

Landmarks
One of the major fishing harbours in Kerala is in Sakthikulangara. Sakthikulangara village and/or the old Sakthikulangara panchayat also includes the major residential areas of Moothezham, Maruthady, Valavilthope, Ozhukkuthodu, Ramankulangara, Vattakkayal, Vallikkeezhu, Poovanpuzha, Aravila, Kavanadu, Kaniyankada, Mukkadu, Venkulangara, Edamanakkavu, Kallumpuram and a few small islands in Ashtamudi lake.

Importance
Sakthikulangara is a prominent place because of its proximity to the following places:

 Seafood Exporting.
 Fish landing centre.
 Boat building yards
 Vattakkayal
 Neendakara Fishing Harbour
 Kavanad & Kollam Bypass
 St John De Britto Church
 Sakthikuklangara Sree Dharma Shastha Temple :The temple is famous for its festival in 'Makaram' month.
 Capithan's Movie Theatre.
 Lakeford School

Sakthikulangara village owes its transformation from a sleepy village to present fishing industry powerhouse to Indo–Norwegian project. Indo-Norwegian Project was Norway's first foreign aid development project.

The project was first established in Neendakara, near Quilon, Kerala in 1953, and the aim was modernisation of fisheries of Kerala, but also improvement of health, sanitation and water supply.

See also
 Kollam
 Kollam Port
 Kollam district
 Kollam Junction
 Kollam Beach
 Paravur

Sakthikulangara Sree Dharma Shasta Temple
A popular legend about the origin of the name Sakthikulangara is related to the foundation of the Sree Dharma Sastha Temple. A Brahmin, a great Vedic scholar, who was returning from attending the Murajapam at the Thiruvananthapuram Sri Padmanabhaswamy Temple, came down to take a bath in the pond near the temple. The things that he had were kept in the pond. He was about to leave after bathing and when he tried to take his things kept in the pond, the Salagrama which has been with him since the time of his ancestors, was so fixed to the bank of the pool that he could not lift it. Realising the power inside the  Salagrama he said "Sakthi kulakarayilo" Hence the name was derived as Sakthikulangara for the place. (Sakthi means power and 'kulangara' means the bank of the pool). Then the locals who gathered there were asked to build a temple for the deity who had fixed iron at the Kulakara.
Sree Dharma Sastha is believed to be the ‘Saving God’ of four communities: Sakthikulangara Cherry, Kannimel Cherry, Kureepuzha Cherry and Meenathu Cherry. Sree Dharma Shastha in this temple is affectionately called " Kunchachaman "
.

The temple is believed to be one of the 108 Ayyappan Kavu temples in Kerala.
The Sakthikulangara Dharma Sastha Temple-Sree Ayyappa Swamy Temple is known for its Utsavam in the Uthram starMalayalam month of Makaram (between mid-January and mid-February).

References

External links
 http://www.sakthikulangara.com/

Villages in Kollam district
Neighbourhoods in Kollam